Sepiriti David Malefane (born 8 August 1994) is a Mosotho international footballer who plays for Bantu as a midfielder.

Career
Malefane has played for Likhopo, Bloemfontein Celtic and Bantu.

He made his international debut for Lesotho in 2014.

References

1994 births
Living people
Lesotho footballers
Lesotho international footballers
Likhopo FC players
Bloemfontein Celtic F.C. players
Bantu FC players
Association football midfielders
Lesotho expatriate footballers
Lesotho expatriate sportspeople in South Africa
Expatriate soccer players in South Africa